The Pittsburgh and Beck's Run Railroad  was a short line railroad in Allegheny County, Pennsylvania, running from the Smithfield Street Bridge to the Jones and Laughlin Iron Works.

See also
Becks Run

History of Allegheny County, Pennsylvania
Defunct Pennsylvania railroads
Transportation in Pittsburgh
Predecessors of the Pittsburgh and Lake Erie Railroad
Railway companies established in 1877
Railway companies disestablished in 1880
American companies established in 1877
American companies disestablished in 1880
1877 establishments in Pennsylvania